is a three-piece Japanese rock band currently signed to DCT Records. They gained prominence in Japan after being featured as vocalists and musicians on Dreams Come True's singles "Good Bye My School Days" and "Sono Saki e". Fuzzy Control has played at the 2005 Summer Sonic Festival and their single "Think Twice" was used as the ending theme for the Mushiking: King of the Beetles anime. They also appeared at the 60th NHK Kōhaku Uta Gassen, having been featured on Dreams Come True's "Sono Saki e".

Members
: Vocals & guitar
: Drums & chorus
: Bass & chorus

Discography

Albums
Chicken - September 27, 2003
First Control - July 21, 2004
2 "Twice" - August 24, 2005
Fuzzy Control - May 19, 2007 (Re-released December 19, 2009)
4 Force - August 13, 2008
8 Single - August 13, 2008
The Gig - September 29, 2010
Super Family Control - October 19, 2011
Rocks - September 4, 2013

Singles
"Shine On" - June 21, 2003
"Later" - May 24, 2004
"Little Girl" - June 9, 2004
"I'll Get the Freedom" - December 16, 2004
"Think Twice" - November 16, 2005
 - March 8, 2006
 - July 26, 2007
 - June 21, 2009
"Latest" - December 2, 2009
"Sunset" - July 7, 2010
"Sweet Rain Sweet Home" - July 13, 2011
"Born to Be Wild" - February 8, 2012
 - October 1, 2012
"Christmas Song" - November 1, 2012

Featured tracks
"Good Bye My School Days" by Dreams Come True
Track 4: 
 by Dreams Come True featuring Fuzzy Control
"Lies, Lies." by Dreams Come True
Track 3: "Lies, Lies. -Guitar Version- feat. Juon from Fuzzy Control"

References

External links
Official website
Victor Entertainment website

Japanese alternative rock groups
Musical groups established in 2003
Musical groups from Okinawa Prefecture